Milpitas Wash Wilderness is a protected wilderness area to the south of the Palo Verde Mountains and to the west of Cibola National Wildlife Refuge and the Colorado River in Imperial County, California.  Established in 2019 by the U.S. Congress, the area is managed by the Bureau of Land Management.  
Wildlife includes the desert tortoise, mountain lion, long-eared owl, leaf nosed bat, Merriam's and desert kangaroo rat, long-tailed and little pocket mice, Bullock's and hooded orioles, towhees, white-crowned sparrow, Brewer's sparrow, warbler, black-headed grosbeak, diamondback rattlesnake, and the endangered Gila woodpecker. Home to the largest Sonoran desert woodland in North America, trees in Milpitas Wash include mesquite, acacia, palo verde, and ironwood.

See also
List of U.S. Wilderness Areas

References

External links
Milpitas Wash Wilderness - California Wilderness Coalition
Fact Sheet - California Wilderness Coalition

IUCN Category Ib
Wilderness areas of California
Protected areas of Imperial County, California
Protected areas established in 2019
2019 establishments in California